Tamás Mellár (born March 18 , 1954 in Alsónyék, Hungary) is a Hungarian economist, statistician, professor and politician. He is a member of parliament in the National Assembly of Hungary (Országgyűlés) since May 2018.

References 

Living people
1954 births
People from Tolna County
Hungarian economists
Hungarian politicians
21st-century Hungarian politicians
Hungarian Democratic Forum politicians
Members of the National Assembly of Hungary (2018–2022)
Members of the National Assembly of Hungary (2022–2026)